Pyragrogonus willeyi, is a species of millipedes in the family Paradoxosomatidae. It is endemic to Sri Lanka.

References

Polydesmida
Endemic fauna of Sri Lanka
Millipedes of Asia
Animals described in 1932